SETE Linhas Aéreas Ltda. (Serviços Especiais de Transportes Executivos) was a domestic airline based in Goiânia, Brazil founded in 1999. The company operated in several cities located in the brazilian states of Goiás, Tocantins, Mato Grosso, Pará and Amapá, and also in the Federal District (Brasília) but since January 1, 2016 it is grounded for restructuring.

According to the National Civil Aviation Agency of Brazil (ANAC), between January and December 2015 Sete had 0.1% of the domestic market share in terms of passengers per kilometer flown.

History
SETE traces its origins to 1976, when Rolim Adolfo Amaro, also founder of TAM Airlines, created an airline specialized in general aviation and maintenance. The airline was sold to Luis Roberto Villela in 1980, who bought its first aircraft, a Mitsubishi.

In 1995 SETE built a hangar at Goiânia Airport and in 1998 it started to offer air-medical services. In 1999 SETE received authorization to operate charter flights and in 2006 it became a regular carrier. Its fleet then consisted of 3 Cessna 208B Grand Caravan. A fourth Cessna arrived in 2000 and a fifth in 2002.

In spite of being the main regional airline of both Central and North-Central regions of Brazil, all regular services were indefinitely suspended on January 1, 2016. During the suspension all services of the airline will be restructured including routes and aircraft. Air taxi services are not affected.

Destinations
As of December 2015 SETE Linhas Aéreas operated scheduled services to the following destinations:

Fleet
As of July 2015 the fleet of Sete Linhas Aéreas included the following aircraft:

Airline affinity program
SETE Linhas Aéreas has no Frequent Flyer Program.

See also
List of defunct airlines of Brazil

References

External links

SETE Linhas Aéreas website 
SETE Táxi Aéreo (air taxi) website 
SETE Linhas Aéreas Photo Archive at airliners.net
SETE Táxi Aéreo Photo Archive at airliners.net

Defunct airlines of Brazil
Airlines established in 1999
Airlines disestablished in 2017
1999 establishments in Brazil